Alan Danson (born 25 January 1933) is a British former cyclist. He competed in the time trial event at the 1956 Summer Olympics.

References

1933 births
Living people
British male cyclists
Olympic cyclists of Great Britain
Cyclists at the 1956 Summer Olympics
Place of birth missing (living people)